Poliopastea laconia is a moth of the family Erebidae. It was described by Herbert Druce in 1884. It is found in Mexico and Guatemala.

References

Poliopastea
Moths described in 1884
Taxa named by Herbert Druce